Pye-Smith is a surname that may refer to:
John Pye-Smith (1774–1851), English theologian
Philip Pye-Smith (1839–1914), English physician and educator

See also
Pye (surname)
Smith (surname)

Compound surnames
English-language surnames